Unity (V) is a liberal-conservative political party in Latvia. It is a member of the New Unity alliance and is positioned on the centre-right on the political spectrum.

It was formed in 2010 as an electoral alliance and in 2011, it was registered as a political party. It was the leading party in the Dombrovskis and Straujuma cabinets from its inception in 2010 until February 2016; it is a member of the current coalition since January 2019 with its member Krišjānis Kariņš as Prime Minister. Unity is a member of the European People's Party (EPP). Since 2017, its chairman of the Main Board has been the former Minister for Economics of Latvia, Arvils Ašeradens, who succeeded former European Commissioner Andris Piebalgs.

History

Origins, governing and coalition party (2010–2018) 

The party was founded as an electoral alliance of the New Era Party, Civic Union, and the Society for Political Change on 6 March 2010. It was reportedly founded in a bid to form a counterweight to the left-wing Harmony Centre alliance, which had been strengthening in polls and elections, while the other right-wing parties (People's Party, For Fatherland and Freedom/LNNK and LPP/LC) were below the electoral threshold of 5%.

The alliance, led by incumbent Prime Minister Valdis Dombrovskis from New Era, achieved a victory in the 2010 parliamentary election, despite the austerity measures enacted by his cabinet during the Great Recession of the late 2000s. Unity led the coalition with ZZS as junior partner until 2011.

On 6 August 2011 the alliance was transformed into a single political party. In the 2011 snap elections, the party came in third, but held on to the PM post in a coalition with the Zatlers' Reform Party and the National Alliance.

After five years in office, Valdis Dombrovskis resigned as PM after the Zolitūde tragedy in early 2014. He was succeeded by party colleague Laimdota Straujuma, who brought ZZS back into her coalition. For the 2014 general election, Unity announced an electoral pact with the Reform Party, which was later followed by a full absorption in March 2015. The party improved on its previous result, coming in second at the polls and gaining 3 extra seats.

The second Straujuma cabinet, however, lasted only for about a year. After the demise of the Straujuma cabinet in late 2015, the party suffered from internal conflicts (e.g. the polarising actions and statements of then party board chair Solvita Āboltiņa) and defections of MPs to other political parties, undermining its ratings. Nevertheless, it remained as the largest parliamentary party in the ZZS-led Kučinskis cabinet and it held 5 ministerial portfolios from early 2016 to 2018.

New Unity alliance, Kariņš government (2018–present) 
After the October 2018 parliamentary elections, New Unity – an alliance formed in April between Unity and five regional parties – became the smallest faction in the parliament with 8 seats out of 100. The subsequent failure of the candidates for PM from the New Conservative Party and KPV LV to form a government by early January 2019 urged the President of Latvia, Raimonds Vējonis, to offer the opportunity to JV's candidate, former MEP Krišjānis Kariņš. The Kariņš cabinet consisting of JV, the New Conservatives, KPV LV, Development/For!, the National Alliance was approved by the Saeima on 23 January 2019.

Election results

Legislative elections

European Parliament

Symbols and logos

See also 
:Category:New Unity politicians

References

External links
Official website
Facebook page

Political parties in Latvia
Conservative parties in Latvia
Liberal parties in Latvia
Political parties established in 2010
Liberal conservative parties
2010 establishments in Latvia
Defunct political party alliances in Latvia
Member parties of the European People's Party